Johannes Sandven (1 November 1909 – 2 September 2000) was a Norwegian educator. He was born in Fana. He was appointed professor at the University of Oslo from 1950 to 1979. He was a co-founder and editor of the journal Scandinavian Journal of Educational Research. He was decorated Knight, First Class of the Order of St. Olav in 1980.

References

1909 births
2000 deaths
Norwegian educationalists
Academic staff of the University of Oslo
Writers from Bergen